Juan Felipe Osorio Arboleda (born 30 January 1995 in La Unión, Antioquia) is a Colombian cyclist, who currently rides for UCI ProTeam . He was named in the startlist for the 2017 Vuelta a España.

Major results
2016
 1st Stage 9 Clásico RCN
2017
 1st  Mountains classification Volta ao Algarve
2019
 2nd Road race, National Road Championships
2020
  Combativity award Stage 9 Vuelta a España
2022
 10th Time trial, National Road Championships

Grand Tour general classification results timeline

References

External links

1995 births
Living people
Colombian male cyclists
Sportspeople from Antioquia Department